Stampers Creek is a stream in Orange County, in the U.S. state of Indiana.

Stampers Creek was named for an obscure pioneer named Stamper.

References

Rivers of Orange County, Indiana
Rivers of Indiana